KS Cracovia is a Polish women's handball team from Kraków. It is a section of the KS Cracovia multi-sports club.

Cracovia enjoyed its golden era between 1957 and 1961, winning four national championships. A founding member of the European Cup in 1961, its major success in the competition was reaching the semifinals in 1968 after winning its fifth championship. Cracovia won four further titles in the second half of the 1980s, but it subsequently declined. In the 2021–22 season it played in the I liga, finishing seventh.

Titles 
 7 Polish Championships
 1957, 1958, 1960, 1961, 1977, 1985, 1987
 2 Polish Cup
 1985, 1988

References 

MKS Cracovia
Sport in Kraków
Polish handball clubs
1926 establishments in Poland
Handball clubs established in 1926